Smoking and Health: Report of the Advisory Committee to the Surgeon General of the United States was a landmark report published on January 11, 1964, by the Surgeon General's Advisory Committee on Smoking and Health, chaired by the then Surgeon General of the United States, Dr. Luther Leonidas Terry, M.D., regarding the negative health effects of tobacco smoking.

Background 
The health effects of tobacco had been debated by users, medical experts, and governments alike since its introduction to European culture. Hard evidence for the ill effects of smoking became apparent with the results of several long-term studies conducted in the early to middle twentieth century, such as the epidemiology studies of Richard Doll and pathology studies of Oscar Auerbach. On June 12, 1957, then-Surgeon General Leroy Burney "declared it the official position of the U.S. Public Health Service that the evidence pointed to a causal relationship between smoking and lung cancer". A committee of the United Kingdom's Royal College of Physicians issued a report on March 7, 1962, which "clearly indicted cigarette smoking as a cause of lung cancer and bronchitis" and argued that "it probably contributed to cardiovascular disease as well." After pressure from the American Cancer Society, the American Heart Association, the National Tuberculosis Association, and the American Public Health Association, President John F. Kennedy authorized Surgeon General Terry's creation of the Advisory Committee. The committee met from November 1962 to January 1964 and analyzed over 7,000 scientific articles and papers.

Committee members 
The Surgeon General's Advisory Committee on Smoking and Health:

 Stanhope Bayne-Jones, M.D., LL.D. (Retired).
 Former Dean. Yale School of Medicine (1935–40), former President. Joint Administrative Board. Cornell University. New York Hospital Medical Center (1947–52): former president. Society of American Bacteriologists (1929). and American Society of Pathology and Bacteriology (1940). Field: Nature and Causation of Disease in Human Populations.
 Walter J. Burdette, M.D., Ph. D.
 Head of Department of Surgery. University of Utah, School of Medicine. Salt Lake City. Fields: Clinical and Experimental Surgery; Genetics.
 William G. Cochran, M.A.
 Professor of Statistics. Harvard University. Field: Mathematical Statistics with: Special Application to Biological Problems.
 Emmanuel Farber, M.D., Ph. D.
 Chairman. Department of Pathology. University of Pittsburgh. Field: Experimental and Clinical Pathology.
 Louis F. Fieser, Ph. D.
 Sheldon Emory. Professor of Organic Chemistry. Harvard University. Field: Chemistry of Carcinogenic Hydrocarbons.
 Jacob Furth, M.D.
 Professor of Pathology. Columbia University. and Director of Pathology Laboratories, Francis Delafield Hospital, New York. Field: Cancer Biology.
 John B. Hickam, M.D.
 Chairman, Department of Internal Medicine. Indiana University, Indianapolis. Fields: Internal Medicine. Physiology of Cardiopulmonary Disease.
 Charles LeMaistre, M.D.
 Professor of Internal Medicine, The University of Texas Southwestern Medical School. and Medical Director. Woodland Hospital. Dallas, Texas. Fields: Internal Medicine. Pulmonary Diseases, Preventative Medicine.
 Leonard M. Schuman, M.D.
 Professor of Epidemiology. University of Minnesota School of Public Health. Minneapolis. Field: Health and its relationship to the Total Environment.
 Maurice H. Seevers, M.D., Ph. D.
 Chairman. Department of Pharmacology University of Michigan, Ann Arbor. Department of Pharmacology. Field: Pharmacology of Anesthesia and Habit-Forming Drugs.
 Chairman: Luther L. Terry, M.D..
 Surgeon General of the United States Public Health Service

Findings 
The report's conclusions were almost entirely focused on the negative health effects of cigarette smoking. It found:
 cigarette smokers had a seventy percent increase in age-corrected mortality rate
 cigarette smoke was the primary cause of chronic bronchitis
 a correlation between smoking, emphysema, and heart disease.
In addition, it reported:
 a causative link between smoking and a ten- to twenty-fold increase in the occurrence of lung cancer
 a positive correlation between pregnant women who smoke and underweight newborns.

As did the World Health Organization during this period, but possibly influenced by the fact that they were all smokers themselves, the Committee defined cigarette smoking as a "habituation" rather than an overpowering "addiction". Committee members agreed with most Americans that this habit (though often strong) was possible for individuals to break.

In the years that followed the Surgeon General's report, millions of Americans successfully chose to quit smoking, with two-thirds to three-quarters of ex-smokers quitting unaided by nicotine replacement methods. In addition, the "cold turkey," or sudden-and-rapid-cessation, method has been found to be the most successful in terms of stopping smoking over long periods of time. However, in a controversial move in 1989, a later Surgeon General, Dr. C. Everett Koop, M.D., shifted course and redefined cigarette smoking as "an addiction" rather than a habit.

Effects 

The report's publication had wide effects across the United States. It was deliberately published on a Saturday to minimize the negative effect on the American stock markets, while maximizing the coverage in Sunday newspapers. The release of the report was one of the top news stories of 1964. It led to policy and public opinion changes such as the Federal Cigarette Labeling and Advertising Act of 1965 and the Public Health Cigarette Smoking Act of 1969, which mandated warning labels on cigarettes and instituted a ban on the broadcasting of cigarette advertisements on radio and/or television.

See also 
Tobacco in the United States

References

External links 
 Full text of the report Archived

Health policy in the United States
Reports of the United States government
Smoking in the United States
1964 in science
1964 documents
Tobacco researchers
Health effects of tobacco